Arthur Barnes (November 17, 1866 – November 24, 1956), Ph.D. was an educator and political figure in Newfoundland. He represented Harbour Grace from 1904 to 1908 and from 1919 to 1924 and Burgeo from 1928 to 1932 in the Newfoundland and Labrador House of Assembly as a Liberal.

He was born in Topsail, Conception Bay, the son of John Barnes and was educated in St. John's. Barnes taught school at Coley's Point, Bay Roberts and St. John's. He was vice-principal of Bishop Feild College and was principal for a school in Bay Roberts. His fiancée Emmeline Dawe died of tuberculosis before they could be married and Barnes took on the care of Dawe's mother, a widow. He served nine years as principal for the normal school in St. John's from 1908 to 1917. He became the first Minister of Education for Newfoundland. Barnes was defeated when he ran for election in Bonavista in 1924. He was elected again in a 1928 by-election. Barnes resigned his seat in 1932 after he was promised a post as governor of the Bank of Newfoundland; he was not named to the post because of a change in government. He died in Bay Roberts at the age of 90.

From 1928 to 1932, he served under Premier Richard Squires in the positions of Colonial Secretary and Railway Commissioner.

References 

Members of the Newfoundland and Labrador House of Assembly
1866 births
1956 deaths
Bishop Feild School alumni
Government ministers of the Dominion of Newfoundland
Newfoundland Colony people
Colonial Secretaries of Newfoundland